The Ellis drainhole is the earliest-known complete mathematical model of a traversable wormhole.  It is a static, spherically symmetric solution of the Einstein vacuum field equations augmented by inclusion of a scalar field  minimally coupled to the geometry of space-time with coupling polarity opposite to the orthodox polarity (negative instead of positive):

Overview
The solution was found in 1969 (date of first submission) by Homer G. Ellis, and independently around the same time by Kirill A. Bronnikov.
Bronnikov pointed out that a two-dimensional analog of the topology of the solution is a hyperboloid of one sheet, and that only use of the antiorthodox coupling polarity would allow a solution with such a topology.  Ellis, whose motivation was to find a nonsingular replacement for the Schwarzschild model of an elementary gravitating particle, showed that only the antiorthodox polarity would do, but found all the solutions for either polarity, as did Bronnikov.  He studied the geometry of the solution manifold for the antiorthodox polarity in considerable depth and found it to be
 composed of two asymptotically flat three-dimensional regions joined at a two-sphere (the 'drainhole'),
 singularity-free,
 devoid of one-way event horizons,
 geodesically complete
 gravitationally attractive on one side of the drainhole and more strongly repulsive on the other,
 equipped with a timelike vector field he interpreted as the velocity field of an 'ether' flowing from rest at infinity on the attractive side, down into the drainhole and out to infinity on the repulsive side, 'creating' (or responding to) gravity by accelerating all the way, and
 traversable through the drainhole in either direction by photons and test particles.

A paper by Chetouani and Clément gave the name "Ellis geometry" to the special case of a drainhole in which the ether is not flowing and there is no gravity, as did also a letter to an editor by Clément.
This special case is often referred to as the "Ellis wormhole".  When the full-blown drainhole is considered in its role as the prototypical traversable wormhole, the name of Bronnikov is attached to it alongside that of Ellis.

The drainhole solution

Imagine two euclidean planes, one above the other.  Pick two circles of the same radius, one above the other, and remove their interiors.  Now
glue the exteriors together at the circles, bending the exteriors smoothly so that there is no sharp edge at the gluing.  If done with care the result will be the catenoid  pictured at right, or something similar.  Next, picture the whole connected upper and lower space filled with a fluid flowing with no swirling into the hole from above and out the lower side, gaining speed all the way and bending the lower region into a more conical shape than is seen in   If you imagine stepping this movie up from flat screen to 3D, replacing the planes by euclidean three-spaces and the circles by spheres, and think of the fluid as flowing from all directions into the hole from above, and out below with directions unchanged, you will have a pretty good idea of what a 'drainhole' is.  The technical description of a drainhole as a space-time manifold is provided by the space-time metric published in 1973.

The drainhole metric solution as presented by Ellis in 1973 has the proper-time forms (with the presence of  made explicit)

where  and 

and

in which

The coordinate ranges are

(To facilitate comparison with the Schwarzschild solution,  of the original solution has been replaced by )

These show, upon comparison of the drainhole metric to the Schwarzschild metric

where, in partially geometrized units,

that the parameter  is the analog for the drainhole of the Schwarzschild mass parameter .

The ether flow

The vector field  generates radial geodesics parametrized by proper time , which agrees with coordinate time  along the geodesics.

The vector field in question is taken to be the velocity field of a more or less substantial 'ether' pervading all of space-time. This ether is in general "more than a mere inert medium for the propagation of electromagnetic waves; it is a restless, flowing continuum whose internal, relative motions manifest themselves to us as gravity.  Mass particles appear as sources or sinks of this flowing ether."

For timelike geodesics in general the radial equation of motion is

One sees from this that
 it is the 'stretching' of the ether flow as measured by the term  that produces the downward pull of gravity,
 every test particle whose orbit dips as low as  will fall through the drainhole,
 there are test particles with enough angular speed                            to balance the downward pull that their orbits (circular ones in particular) are confined to the part of the upper region where ,
 the downward pull produces in the upper region acceleration toward the drainhole, thus attractive gravity, but in the lower region acceleration away from the drainhole, thus repulsive gravity,
 the downward pull reaches its maximum where  is a minimum, namely, at the 'throat' of the drainhole where , and
 if  a test particle can sit at rest (with ) anywhere in space. (This is the special case of the nongravitating drainhole known as the Ellis wormhole.)

Traversability

It is clear from the radial equation of motion that test particles starting from any point in the upper region with no radial velocity 
() will, without sufficient angular velocity 
, fall down through the drainhole and into the lower region. Not so clear but nonetheless true is that a test particle starting from a point in the lower region can with sufficient upward velocity pass through the drainhole and into the upper region. Thus the drainhole is 'traversable' by test particles in both directions.  The same holds for photons.

A complete catalog of geodesics of the drainhole can be found in the Ellis paper.

Absence of horizons and singularities; geodesical completeness

Wherever , so that , light waves struggling against the ether flow can gain ground. (This situation is described in jest by: "People in light canoes should avoid ethereal rapids.")

Because

the drainhole metric encompasses neither a 'coordinate singularity' where  nor a 'geometric singularity' where , not even asymptotic ones. The drainhole manifold is, therefore, geodesically complete.

Strength of repulsion

To learn the repulsive mass of the drainhole requires finding an isometry of the drainhole manifold that exchanges the upper and lower regions.

and

The isometry identifies the point of  having coordinates  with the point of  having coordinates .

Asymptotic flatness

The parameter n

Unlike the parameter , interpreted as the attractive gravitational mass of the drainhole, the parameter  has no obvious physical interpretation.

For reasons given in Sec. 6.1 of a 2015 paper, Ellis suggests that  specifies in some way the inertial mass of the particle modeled by the drainhole. He writes further that a "'Higgsian' way of expressing this idea is to say that the drainhole 'acquires' (inertial) mass from the scalar field ".

Application

By disallowing Einstein's unjustified 1916 assumption that inertial mass is a source of gravity, Ellis arrives at new, improved field equations, a solution of which is a cosmological model that fits well the supernovae observations that in 1998 revealed the acceleration of the expansion of the universe.  In these equations there are two scalar fields minimally coupled to the space-time geometry with opposite polarities.  The "cosmological constant"  is replaced by a net repulsive density of gravitating matter owed to the presence of primordial drainhole "tunnels" and continuous creation of new tunnels, each with its excess of repulsion over attraction. Those drainhole tunnels associated with particles of visible matter provide their gravity; those not tied to visible matter are the unseen "dark matter". "Dark energy" is the net repulsive density of all the drainhole tunnels. The cosmological model has a "big bounce" instead of a "big bang", inflationary acceleration out of the bounce, and a smooth transition to an era of decelerative coasting, followed ultimately by a return to 
de Sitter-like exponential expansion.

Further applications

 The Ellis wormhole served as the starting point for building the traversable wormhole featured in the 2014 movie Interstellar (although the model that was used in the end differed significantly).
 Scattering by an Ellis wormhole
 Spatial lensing (not gravitational lensing, as there is no gravity) in the Ellis wormhole
Microlensing by the Ellis wormhole
Wave effect in lensing by the Ellis wormhole
Image centroid displacements due to microlensing by the Ellis wormhole
Exact lens equation for the Ellis wormhole
Lensing by wormholes

References

Wormhole theory
Exact solutions in general relativity